The Old Town Bar and Restaurant is a noted bar and restaurant located between Park Avenue and Broadway at 45 E. 18th Street in the Flatiron District, Manhattan in New York City, one block north of Union Square. Originally a German establishment called Viemeisters, the bar has been in continuous operation since 1892, making it one of the oldest bars in the New York City area.

When it first opened, Viemeisters was a place that served only drinks, but during Prohibition, the bar was forced to change its name to Craig's Restaurant and start serving food in order to operate as a speakeasy. After the end of Prohibition and the closing of the nearby 18th Street Subway station in 1948, the bar began to fall into disrepair. It wasn't until the late 1960s, when local bar manager Larry Meagher took over operations, that the bar saw a resurgence of popularity.

The Old Town Bar has managed to preserve a lot of its original fixtures which date back to the 19th century. The bar itself is 55 feet long and made of marble and mahogany. The ceiling, made of "tin" – actually pressed steel tiles, is 16 feet high. Other original furnishings include large beveled mirrors, antique cash registers, wooden booths, and New York's oldest dumbwaiter that ferries food orders from the upstairs kitchen down to the bar. Another notable feature is the row of old-style full-length urinals in the first floor Men's room, dating back to 1910. A creaky wooden staircase (also original) leads to an upstairs dining area, which was closed for several years before being reopened in the 1970s to cater to an unexpected increase in patrons coming to the bar on their lunch break.

Several artists and Hollywood directors have used the Old Town as a backdrop for their productions and movie scenes, including rap group House of Pain for a music video for their 1992 single "Jump Around", and director Whit Stillman for his 1998 feature film The Last Days of Disco. It also appeared in the films The Devil's Own (1997), State of Grace (1990), Q & A (1990), Bullets over Broadway (1994), and Madonna's 1993 "Bad Girl" video. The bar also appeared in the television shows, Sex and the City, Mad About You, The Marvelous Mrs. Maisel and in the opening montage of Late Night with David Letterman from 1987 to 1992. The exterior was used in the television sitcom "Mad About You" to represent the fictional establishment "Riffs" in the show.

References

External links
  
 "The Best Bites in Burgertown" by Ed Levine, The New York Times, January 15, 2003

Drinking establishments in Manhattan
Restaurants established in 1892
1892 establishments in New York (state)
Flatiron District